The United States Collegiate Ski and Snowboard Association (USCSA)  is the sports federation for collegiate skiing and snowboarding in the United States. With over 180 member colleges, the USCSA fields some 5,000 men and women, alpine, Nordic, freeski and snowboard athletes in over 200 competitive events annually. The organization offers alpine skiing, Nordic skiing, freestyle skiing and snowboarding.

Mission
"To be the National governing body of team ski and snowboard competition at the collegiate level.  To promote and increase awareness of and participation in alpine skiing, nordic skiing, freestyle skiing, and snowboarding in the United States.  To provide competition and development opportunities for student-athletes in a team atmosphere leading toward National titles in each discipline."

Overview
The United States Collegiate Ski & Snowboard Association is the sports federation for collegiate team ski racing and snowboarding in America. 
The USCSA assures that student-athletes of all levels and abilities should have access to a quality and exciting venue of competition. 
The USCSA recognizes, that for athletes to be truly successful individuals, academics should take priority over ski sport competition. To help foster this, the USCSA stresses education first and offers a variety of academic based awards.
Team performance is emphasized within the USCSA.  Teams field five racers with the top three performances being used for the team score.

Organization Structure
Competition takes place across three progressive tiers.  Conference qualifiers determine the participants at the six USCSA regional championships.  The Regional Championships are the last step on the road to the annual United States Collegiate Ski and Snowboard National Championship, the showcase event in college snowsports competition.  The USCSA National Championships sees over 450 athletes, participating in more than 40 schools.

Conferences By Region with Current Conference Coordinators
Far West Region: Northern California (Alec Tandara-Kuhns) and Southwest (Patrick Wilcox) Conferences
West Region: Northwest (Ron Bonneau), Rocky Mountain (Nick LaBue) and Grand Teton (Jerry Wolf) Conferences
Midwest Region: Midwest Conference (Robin Dzubay)
Eastern Region: Eastern Conference (Chris Eder)
Mid-Atlantic Region: Allegheny (Sarah Geiger), Southeast (Doug Grayson) and Atlantic Highlands (Corey Tolkin) Conferences
New York Region: Mideast Conference (Jim Longo)

References

External links
 US Collegiate Ski & Snowboard Association Official Website

College skiing in the United States
Skiing organizations
Snowboarding